Martin Leslie (born 17 November 1962) is a former Australian rules footballer who played for the Brisbane Bears in the Australian Football League (AFL) and Port Adelaide Football Club in the South Australian National Football League (SANFL). 

Leslie made his SANFL debut for Port Adelaide in 1981, winning the club best and fairest award in 1986 and a premiership in 1988.

At the VFL National Draft in 1986 Leslie was the number one draft choice, selected by Brisbane. Leslie deferred moving to Brisbane until the end of the 1988 SANFL season. Making his VFL debut in 1989, Leslie would eventually play 107 games for the Bears and won their best and fairest award, in 1990.

External links

1962 births
Living people
Australian rules footballers from South Australia
Port Adelaide Football Club (SANFL) players
Port Adelaide Football Club players (all competitions)
Brisbane Bears players
South Australian State of Origin players
Brisbane Bears Club Champion winners
All-Australians (1953–1988)